Major General George Jacob Richards (April 12, 1891 – October 1, 1984) was a United States Army officer who was a recipient of the Army Distinguished Service Medal and the Legion of Merit during World War II. He was buried in Arlington National Cemetery.

Commissioned into the United States Army Corps of Engineers in June 1915, he served in the United States during World War I and, during the interwar period, he attended the Naval War College from July 1937 to March 1938.

References

External links

Generals of World War II

1891 births
1984 deaths
United States Army Corps of Engineers personnel
United States Army generals
United States Army personnel of World War I
Recipients of the Legion of Merit
Recipients of the Distinguished Service Medal (US Army)
Graduates of the United States Military Academy Class of 1915
United States Army generals of World War II
United States Military Academy alumni
Naval War College alumni
Military personnel from Pennsylvania
Burials at Arlington National Cemetery